The Liberal Regenerator Party was a Portuguese political party established in 1901, under the leadership of João Franco. The party was asked to form a government by King Carlos I in 1906, and its leader ultimately accused of being partly responsible for the assassination of the King in 1908, for the policies he enacted during its tenure.

References

Defunct political parties in Portugal
Political parties established in 1902
1902 establishments in Portugal
Conservative parties in Portugal